Bouar Airport  is an airport serving Bouar, a city in the Nana-Mambere prefecture of the Central African Republic.

Most of the runway is dirt, with asphalt pavement on both ends.

The Bouar non-directional beacon (Ident: FBU) is located on the field.

See also

Transport in the Central African Republic
List of airports in the Central African Republic

References

External links
OpenStreetMap - Bouar Airport
OurAirports - Bouar Airport

Airports in the Central African Republic
Buildings and structures in Nana-Mambéré